Nikita Ilyich Chaly (born 7 May 1996) is a Russian football player.

Club career
He made his debut in the Russian Second Division for FC Chernomorets Novorossiysk on 12 July 2013 in a game against FC Krasnodar-2.

He made his Russian Football National League debut for FC Chayka Peschanokopskoye on 20 July 2019 in a game against FC Baltika Kaliningrad.

References

External links
 

1996 births
People from Novorossiysk
Living people
Russian footballers
Association football midfielders
FC Chernomorets Novorossiysk players
FC Tyumen players
FC Chayka Peschanokopskoye players
Sportspeople from Krasnodar Krai